Roman Humenberger (born 26 January 1945) is an Austrian former cyclist. He competed at the 1972 Summer Olympics and the 1976 Summer Olympics.

References

External links
 

1945 births
Living people
Austrian male cyclists
Olympic cyclists of Austria
Cyclists at the 1972 Summer Olympics
Cyclists at the 1976 Summer Olympics
Place of birth missing (living people)
20th-century Austrian people